Interest Equalization Tax was a domestic tax measure implemented by U.S. President John F. Kennedy in July 1963.  It was meant to make it less profitable for U.S. investors to invest abroad by taxing the purchase of foreign securities.  The design of the tax was to reduce the balance-of-payment deficit. Originally intended to be a temporary tax, it lasted until 1974.

Purpose
The purpose of the tax was to decrease the balance of payments deficit in the US. This was achieved conceptually by making investments in foreign securities less appealing. By increasing the price of the security, investors will buy fewer of them, all else equal. With fewer domestic investors purchasing foreign securities, capital outflows will be lower, thereby reducing the balance-of-payments deficit. The equation for the balance of payments is:
 
The identity for the capital account is:

So when capital outflows decrease, the capital account increases. When the capital account increases, the balance-of-payments increases.

Dates Effective
The tax was effective on purchases made after July 18, 1963. It was scheduled to expire on January 1, 1966, but was extended multiple times, and eventually abolished on January, 1974.

Amount of the tax
 For foreign stocks, the tax is 15% of the price
 For debt obligations there is a range between the following bounds:
 For debt obligations having 3 to 3.5 years remaining until maturity, the tax is 2.75% of purchase price
 For debt obligations having 28.5 years remaining until maturity, the tax is 15% of purchase price

Exemptions
 Debt obligations with less than 3 years remaining until maturity
 Investments in developing countries
 Investments that result in the U.S. citizen owning a 10% or more voting stock in the foreign corporation
 Debt obligations that were issued to a U.S. person in order for that foreign corporation to purchase U.S.-produced goods
 Foreign securities that would endanger international monetary stability. The President will determine if any foreign securities qualify for this exemption. Canadian-issued securities were the only initial exemption from the tax in 1963
 Debt obligations acquired by commercial banks to make loans (deposits, etc.)
 Insurance companies who invest in foreign securities with premiums collected from foreigners
 Labor unions that invest in foreign securities with the money from dues collected abroad from foreign members
Investment banks that underwrite foreign securities are exempt from the tax when they acquire and resell such securities from the corporation
U.S.-controlled foreign corporations (>50% owned by U.S. persons and registered on U.R. securities exchanges)

Estimated Revenue
The tax was expected to raise $30 million per year.

Effect on the Deficit
As the original intent of the Interest Equalization Tax was the reduce the balance-of-payments deficit, a majority consider the tax successful.
 Between 1961 and 1964, the deficit averaged $2.5 billion
 In the years 1965 to 1966, the deficit averaged $1.1 billion
 In 1967, the deficit was $3.5 billion
 In 1968, there was a surplus of $93 million
Since many factors influence the balance-of-payments account, the effect of the tax is unclear. However, there was a positive trend in the years after it was enacted.

Effect on Financial Markets

The interest equalization tax "brought American investment activity in foreign markets to a virtual standstill."  However, financial markets responded over time with massive evasion of the tax, along with the development of the eurodollar market.

References

United States federal taxation legislation